Derek Fisher (born 1974) is an American former professional basketball player.

It may also refer to:
 Derek Fisher (baseball) (born 1993), American professional baseball player